Rick Reedy High School, or RHS (locally referred to as Reedy), is a four-year public high school located in Frisco, Texas. It is part of the Frisco Independent School District. It is one of eleven high schools in the district, and is named after Rick Reedy, who served as the district's superintendent for 16 years. This school was built to relieve the Frisco and Wakeland High Schools.

Reedy opened with 9th and 10th graders in the 2015–2016 school year. The first graduating class was the class of 2018.

Athletics

Reedy High School competes in the following sports:

 Baseball
 Basketball
 Cross Country
 Football
 Golf
 Powerlifting
 Soccer
 Softball
 Swimming and Diving
 Tennis
 Track and Field
 Volleyball
 Wrestling

State Finalists 
Volleyball
2022(5A)

References

External links 
 

Educational institutions established in 2015
Frisco Independent School District high schools
High schools in Denton County, Texas
2015 establishments in Texas
Frisco, Texas